Andrew Feldherr is professor of classics at Princeton University from where he also earned his bachelor's degree. He received his PhD from the University of California at Berkeley.

Selected publications
 Spectacle and Society in Livy's History. University of California Press, 1998.
 The Cambridge Companion to the Roman Historians. (Cambridge Companions to Literature) Cambridge University Press, 2009.
 Playing Gods: Ovid's Metamorphoses and the Politics of Fiction. Princeton University Press, 2010.
 The Oxford History of Historical Writing: Volume 1: Beginnings to AD 600. Oxford University Press, 2011. (Editor with Grant Hardy)

References

External links 
Andrew Feldherr lecturing.

Year of birth missing (living people)
Living people
Princeton University faculty
Princeton University alumni
University of California, Berkeley alumni